NextGEN Gallery is a free and open-source image management plugin for the WordPress content management system. It has been downloaded 32 million times (as of June 2021), making it the fifth most popular plugin for WordPress.

Licensing 

Like WordPress, NextGEN is released and governed by the GNU General Public License. NextGEN's source code is publicly available from its GitHub repository.

See also 
 WordPress
 Content Management System
 Plugin Architecture
 Free and open-source software
 GNU General Public License

References

External links 
 NextGEN Gallery Home Page
 NextGEN Gallery Page on WordPress.org

WordPress